Víctor Hermosillo y Celada (born 28 August 1939) is a Mexican politician affiliated with the PAN. He currently serves as Senator of the LXII Legislature of the Mexican Congress representing Baja California. He was also Municipal President of Mexicali during the 1998-2001 period.

References

1939 births
Living people
Politicians from Mexico City
National Action Party (Mexico) politicians
Members of the Senate of the Republic (Mexico)
21st-century Mexican politicians
Monterrey Institute of Technology and Higher Education alumni
Municipal presidents of Mexicali
Senators of the LXII and LXIII Legislatures of Mexico